Johnathan Lewis Davis (born April 26, 1990) is an American former professional baseball outfielder. He played in Major League Baseball (MLB) for the Tampa Bay Rays.

Career
Davis attended Compton High School in Compton, California. Davis did not play baseball in high school, and had only played one year of organized baseball as a little leaguer at age 13. Davis attended West Los Angeles College in 2013, where he hit .336/.374/.549/.923 with 3 home runs, 23 RBI, and 22 stolen bases in his only season of college baseball.

Milwaukee Brewers
Davis was drafted by the Milwaukee Brewers in the 22nd round, with the 662nd overall selection, of the 2013 MLB draft.

Davis played for the AZL Brewers in 2013, hitting .294/.351/.363/.714 with 9 RBI and 17 stolen bases. He played for the Wisconsin Timber Rattlers in 2014, hitting .258/.317/.284/.601 with 16 RBI and 32 stolen bases. He played for the Brevard County Manatees in 2015, hitting .216/.256/.270/.526 in just 10 games due to a torn anterior cruciate ligament (ACL). He split the 2016 season between Brevard County and the Biloxi Shuckers, hitting a combined .278/.353/.336/.689 with 1 home run, 20 RBI, and 32 stolen bases. He returned to Biloxi for the 2017 season, hitting .263/.316/.341/.657 with 5 home runs, 30 RBI, and 52 stolen bases. He opened the 2018 season with the Colorado Springs Sky Sox and appeared in nine games before being granted his release by the Brewers that April.

Kansas City T-Bones
Davis signed with the Kansas City T-Bones of the American Association on May 23, 2018, and appeared in 11 games for them.

Tecolotes de los Dos Laredos
He finished the 2018 season with the Tecolotes de los Dos Laredos of the Mexican League, hitting .312/.384/.485/.869 with 4 home runs, 25 RBI, and 28 stolen bases. He returned to Dos Laredos in 2019, hitting .298/.356/.392/.749 with 4 home runs, 33 RBI, and 48 stolen bases in 92 games.

Guerreros de Oaxaca
He then played for the Guerreros de Oaxaca, with whom he appeared in 14 games.

Tampa Bay Rays
On August 29, 2019, Davis signed a minor league contract with the Tampa Bay Rays. He appeared in six games between the Montgomery Biscuits and the Durham Bulls.

The Rays selected Davis' contract and promoted him to the major leagues on September 11, 2019. He made his major league debut that night versus the Texas Rangers as a pinch runner. Davis recorded his first career hit on September 13, a pinch hit triple off Jake Jewell. On October 30, 2019, Davis was outrighted off the Rays roster. He became a free agent following the 2019 season. Davis re-signed with the Rays on a minor league deal on February 3, 2020. Davis did not play in a game in 2020 due to the cancellation of the minor league season because of the COVID-19 pandemic. He became a free agent on November 2, 2020.

Sultanes de Monterrey
On June 11, 2021, Davis signed with the Sultanes de Monterrey of the Mexican League. He appeared in 3 games, going 3 for 11 with 2 RBIs, before he was moved to the injured list on June 17. On June 28, Davis was released by the team.

Mariachis de Guadalajara
On July 8, 2021, Davis signed with the Mariachis de Guadalajara of the Mexican League. He became a free agent following the season.

Gastonia Honey Hunters
On March 27, 2022, Davis signed with the Gastonia Honey Hunters of the Atlantic League of Professional Baseball. In 21 games, Davis batted .307/.371/.398 with 13 RBIs and 9 stolen bases.

Leones de Yucatán
On May 25, 2022, Davis's contract was purchased by the Leones de Yucatán of the Mexican League. He played in 17 games for Yucatán, hitting .200/.232/.262 with one home run, four RBI, and 8 stolen bases.

On February 20, 2023, Davis retired from professional baseball.

References

External links

1990 births
Living people
African-American baseball players
American expatriate baseball players in Mexico
Arizona League Brewers players
Baseball players from California
Biloxi Shuckers players
Bravos de Margarita players
Brevard County Manatees players
Colorado Springs Sky Sox players
Durham Bulls players
Gastonia Honey Hunters players
Guerreros de Oaxaca players
Kansas City T-Bones players
Leones de Yucatán players
Major League Baseball outfielders
Mexican League baseball center fielders
Mexican League baseball right fielders
Montgomery Biscuits players
Navegantes del Magallanes players
American expatriate baseball players in Venezuela
Sportspeople from Compton, California
Sultanes de Monterrey players
Tampa Bay Rays players
Tecolotes de los Dos Laredos players
Tomateros de Culiacán players
West Los Angeles Wildcats baseball players
Wisconsin Timber Rattlers players
21st-century African-American sportspeople